Shibam District is a district of the Hadhramaut Governorate, Yemen. Its capital is the town of Shibam, famous for its mudbrick-made tower houses and known as the "Manhattan of the desert". As of 2003, the district had a population of 48,829 inhabitants.

See also
 Middle East
 Shibam Kawkaban District
 South Arabia

References

Districts of Hadhramaut Governorate